Scleraxonia is a suborder of corals, a member of the phylum Cnidaria.

Characteristics
Members of Scleraxonia have a skeletal axis made of calcified spicules, organic fibres or both, which may be separate, linked or fused together.

Families and genera
There are nine recognised families in this suborder and over thirty genera, with four families (Anthothelidae, Briareidae, Coralliidae and Subergorgiidae) containing some deep-water species and two families (Paragorgiidae and Parisididae) being exclusively deep water.

Families and genera in this suborder include:
 Anthothelidae Broch, 1916
 Alertigorgia Kükenthal, 1908
 Anthothela Verrill, 1879
 Briareopsis Bayer, 1993
 Erythropodium Kölliker, 1865
 Iciligorgia Duchassaing, 1870
 Lateothela Moore, Alderslade & Miller, 2017
 Solenocaulon Gray, 1862
 Stereogorgia
 Tubigorgia Pasternak, 1985
 Williamsium Moore, Alderslade & Miller, 2017
 Briareidae Gray, 1859
 Briareum Blainville, 1834
 Lignopsis Perez & Zamponi, 2000
 Pseudosuberia Kükenthal, 1919
 Coralliidae Lamouroux, 1812
 Corallium Cuvier, 1798
 Hemicorallium Gray, 1867
 Paracorallium Bayer & Cairns, 2003
 Melithaeidae Gray, 1870
 Asperaxis Alderslade, 2007
 Melithaea Milne-Edwards, 1857
 Paragorgiidae Kukenthal, 1916
 Paragorgia Milne-Edwards, 1857
 Sibogagorgia Stiasny, 1937
 Parisididae Aurivillius, 1931
 Parisis Verrill, 1864
 Spongiodermidae Wright & Studer, 1889
 Callipodium Verrill, 1876
 Diodogorgia Kuekenthal, 1919
 Homophyton Gray, 1866
 Sclerophyton Cairns & Wirshing, 2015
 Titanideum Verrill, 1864
 Tripalea Bayer, 1955
 Subergorgiidae Gray, 1859
 Annella Gray, 1858
 Rosgorgia Lopez Gonzalez & Gili, 2001
 Subergorgia Gray, 1857
 Victorgorgiidae Moore, Alderslade & Miller, 2017
 Victorgorgia Lopez Gonzalez & Briand, 2002

References

 
Alcyonacea
Cnidarian suborders